Mohabbath is a 2011 Malayalam-language musical romance film directed and produced by East Coast Vijayan. It stars Meera Jasmine, Munna and Anand Michael in the lead roles. Written by Siddique Shameer based on his own novel Kalippavakal, the film features music by S. Balakrishnan, who makes his comeback through this film. Renowned singer Hariharan appears as himself in a song sequence while Roma does a cameo role.

The film concerns a love triangle between characters played by Meera Jasmine, Anand Michael and Munna. It reached theatres on 28 April.

Plot 
Anwar is a final year medical student in Bangalore and Sajna studies in a local professional college. They are cousins and their marriage had been fixed in childhood. Sajna's college-mate Ameer falls in love with her. Sajna tries to explain her situation about being engaged and even insults him for being poor but in vain. The film takes unexpected turn in between. Sajna's family becomes poor and Ameer has a windfall. Sajna's wedding is cancelled and Ameer comes in as saviour and revives his proposal through proper channels. The film has an unexpected climax with Anwar returns to their lives.

Cast 

 Meera Jasmine as Sajna
 Anand Michael as Anwar
 Munna as Ameer
 Nedumudi Venu
 Jagathy Sreekumar
 Salim Kumar
 Ashokan
 Suresh Krishna
 Devan
 P. Sreekumar
 Beyon
 Shari
 Urmila Unni
  Lakshmi Priya
 Niranjan
 Nobi
 Arun
 Ajith
 Thejas
 Master Jeevan
 Sadhana
 Ambika Mohan
 Gayathri

Production 

The pooja of the film held at East Coast Studio, Thiruvananthapuram, on 12 November 2010. The songs recording completed on 22 November 2010. The shooting of the film began at Vazhakala, Ernakulam, on 10 December 2010. Singer K. G. Jayan did the camera switch on ceremony. The production completed in February 2011.

Soundtrack 
Music: S. Balakrishnan, K. A. Latheef; Lyrics: Vayalar Sarath Chandra Varma

"Atharu Peyyana" — Hariharan & Manjari
"Ente Padachavane" — Shankar Mahadevan & Afsal
"Thennalin Kaikal" — Hariharan & Manjari
"Chantham Thikanjoru" — Jyotsna
"Kanakalipiyil" — Unni Menon
"Thayimani Mulle" — Sujatha
"Atharu Peyyana" — Manjari & M. G. Sreekumar
"Chantham Thikanjoru" — Afsal
"Atharu Peyyana" (Remix) — Hariharan & Manjari

References

External links 
 
 S. Balakrishnan touch again. Malayala Manorama. (In Malayalam). Retrieved 2011-02-27.
 http://www.manoramaonline.com/cgi-bin/MMOnline.dll/portal/ep/malayalamContentView.do?contentId=8635995&programId=1073752866&BV_ID=@@@

2010s Malayalam-language films
Indian romance films